The American Society of Pension Professionals & Actuaries (ASPPA) is a national organization for career retirement plan professionals. The membership consists of the many disciplines supporting retirement income management and benefits policy. ASPPA represents those who have made a career of retirement plan and pension policy work.

ASPPA was founded in 1966 originally as an actuarial organization. Since then ASPPA has expanded and diversified its membership to include all types of pension professionals — from actuaries, consultants, and administrators to insurance professionals, financial planners, accountants, attorneys, and human resource managers.

Exam-based Professional Credentials

ASPPA offers the following examination-based professional credentials:
Tax-Exempt & Governmental Plan Consultant (TGPC)
Qualified Plan Financial Consultant (QPFC)
Qualified 401(k) Administrator (QKA)
Qualified Pension Administrator (QPA)
Certified Pension Consultant (CPC)
Fellow, Society of Pension Actuaries (FSPA)

The examination requirements for the above certifications include proficiency in the following subject areas:
Retirement Plan Fundamentals
Plan Financial Consulting
Administration Issues of Defined contribution plans
Administration Issues of Defined benefit plans
Financial and Fiduciary Aspects of Qualified Pension Plans.

Conferences

ASPPA provides or co-sponsors more than 15 major conferences in the retirement plan industry throughout the year.

See also 
Employee Retirement Income Security Act
Retirement plan
Retirement plans in the United States
Human resources
Human resource consulting
Enrolled Actuary

References

External links
Home Page for ASPPA
 ASPPA Newsroom

Actuarial associations
Professional associations based in the United States